Chulucanas is a town in Morropón Province, Piura Region, Peru. It lies in the Piura Valley just north of the confluence of the Charanal River with the Piura River. Chulucanas is the administrative seat for both Chulucanas District and Morropón Province.

The town is famous for its pottery. Originally dating from pre-Inca times it is today exported all over the world. It is one of seven products that the Peruvian government supports through its Center for Technological Innovation (CITE). Designs are varied, but are predominated by black and white. There are several bigger companies but a lot of small manufactures are in Chulucanas itself and in the nearby village of Quatro Esquinas. 

A major festival for the town is the Fiesta de Cristo Resucitado at Easter.

Operating in Chulucanas is Victor's Vision, a nonprofit organization which provides supplemental academic and personal support, guidance, and resources to bright, impoverished youth.  

Notes and references

Populated places in the Piura Region

qu:Chulucanas